Janq'u Qala (Aymara janq'u white, qala stone, "white stone", also spelled Janko Kala) is a mountain in the Bolivian Andes which reaches a height of approximately . It is located in the Cochabamba Department, Quillacollo Province, Quillacollo Municipality. Janq'u Qala lies at the lake named Wathiya Quta (also spelled Batae, Batea, Beata).

References 

Mountains of Cochabamba Department